Higgins Bay, formally called Lower Rudeston, is a hamlet located in the Town of Arietta in Hamilton County, New York, United States. Higgins Bay is located on the southern shore of Piseco Lake, located on a small bay in the lake, also called Higgins Bay. It is on NY-8, north of the junction of Routes NY-8 and NY-10.

References

Hamlets in Hamilton County, New York
Hamlets in New York (state)